Unfulfillment is the third studio album released in 2011 by the Scottish grunge band Stiltskin. It is their first studio release in six years.

Tracks

Personnel 
Ray Wilson - lead & backing vocals, guitar
Uwe Metzler - guitar, backing vocals
Ali Ferguson -  guitar, backing vocals
Lawrie MacMillan - bass guitar, backing vocals
Ashley MacMillan - drums, percussion
Steve Wilson - additional guitars, backing vocals
Filip Walcerz - keyboards

External links 

2011 albums
Stiltskin albums